Paulo Machado may refer to:
Paulo Machado (born 1986), Portuguese footballer
Paulo Machado (swimmer) (born 1978), Brazilian swimmer
, president of São Paulo Futebol Clube and founder of Rede Record
Paulo Machado de Carvalho Filho (1924–2010), Brazilian businessman

See also
Estádio do Pacaembu, Brazil, official name Estádio Municipal Paulo Machado de Carvalho